Lourdes Casal (April 5, 1938 – February 1, 1981) was an important poet and activist for the Cuban community. She was internationally known for her contributions to psychology, writing, and Cuban politics. Born and raised in Cuba, she sought exile in New York because of Cuban communist rule. Casal received a master's degree in psychology in 1962 and later, a doctorate in 1975 from the New School for Social Research. She wrote the book El caso Padilla: literatura y revolucion en Cuba, which illustrated the failing relationship between writers and Cuban officials. A year later, she co-founded a journal named Nueva Generation which focused on creating dialogue on relationships between Cubans living abroad and on the island. Casal earned notoriety by attempting to reconcile Cuban exiles in the United States. She was instrumental in organizing a dialogue between Cuban immigrants and Fidel Castro, which led to the release of thousands of Cuban prisoners. She was the first Cuban-American to receive the Casa de las Américas Prize, which was awarded to her posthumously in 1981.

Early life 
Lourdes Emilia de la Caridad Casal y Valdés was born on 5 April 1938 in Havana to Emilia Valdés, a teacher, and Pedro Casal, a dentist and physician. Her family was of mixed-racial descent, including African, Chinese and Spanish ancestry. She was privately educated until 1951, when she entered Institute No. 2 in El Vedado. She graduated in 1954 with a bachelor's degree in science and letters with the simultaneous certification as a land appraiser and surveyor. Furthering her studies, Casal enrolled in St. Thomas of Villanova Catholic University (Villanova), pursuing a degree in chemical engineering.  She became editor of several publications while she was studying, including Memoria and Revista Insula, as well as a regular contributor to the newspaper El Quibú. She joined the Cultural Association and served as its Secretary General and became president of the women's group of the Catholic Youth Organization, of Villanova. She won the second prize of the 1956-1957 term literary competition with a paper on the work of Father Félix Varela, which led her to change direction the following term and enroll in the school of psychology.

As the country radicalized, Casal became involved with the Catholic elements of the 26th of July Movement participating with other students from Villanova. She was active in the anti-Batista Student Revolutionary Directorate and like other members within the group, switched sides after the Cuban Revolution to oppose what they saw as a betrayal of the revolutionary ideals. She worked briefly in the counterrevolutionary movement in Cuba, but in 1962 was forced into exile. As a Director from the Consejo Revolucionario Cubano, she made a tour of Africa, underwritten by the CIA, collecting information on the continent and published an account of her experiences in Cuba Nueva.

Career

Professorship 
Settling in New York in 1962, Casal enrolled in psychology courses at the New School for Social Research and completed her master's degree in 1962. She taught at the City University of New York and simultaneously began a prolific writing career. Her works focused on her need to understand people; she analyzed topics in literature, politics, and the social sciences. Casal later moved to Rutgers University and then in 1969 co-founded the Institute for Cuban Studies at Rutgers She also taught at Dominican College of Blauvelt. An interesting aspect of Casal's writing is that her scholarly works primarily were written in English, while her literary works were written in Spanish.

Writings 
Casal wrote many poems and articles about Cuba and exploring what it meant to be an exile. In her poetry, she explored how being an exile had changed her life, making her no longer only Cuban, but with a recognition that she would never fully be a New Yorker. Racial and social inequality, the suppressive politics of both her homeland and adopted home, and struggle to understand changed Casal from an opponent to a supporter of the Cuban government in the early 1970s. In 1971, she began compiling documents to explore the arrest of the poet Heberto Padilla, and her article El Caso Padilla became a pivotal point in changing her stance on Castro. She co-founded two journals Nueva Generación (1972), which aimed to critically explore both positive and negative effects of the Cuban regime and Areíto (1974), which was openly supportive of the Cuban state.

Travel to Cuba and Castro advocacy

In 1973, she became the first US exile from Cuba to return to the country. Being invited by the government to return was at the time a novel event, as the government stance had branded those who left as betrayers of the revolution. She stayed from May to September and from that point forward was an outspoken advocate of the Cuban government. At times her advocacy was seen to divide the Cuban exile community, but her ability to maintain her position and allow voices of opposition to speak as well, gained overall respect of the diaspora.

Casal was awarded the Cintas Fellowship in 1974 and completed her PhD from the New School for Social Research in 1975. In the mid-seventies, she explored racism and its cultural context, such as the difference of being mulatto in Cuba verses black in the United States. In 1973, she wrote Los Fundadores: Alfonso y Otros Cuentos (The Founders: Alfonso and Other Stories) which discussed the history of Chinese-Cubans. She co-wrote with Rafael Prohias The Cuban Minority in the United States in 1974, comparing the different experiences of white and black Cuban migrants in terms of their "success". In 1977, Casal began work on the Antonio Maceo Brigade, a project aimed at reuniting young Cuban-Americans with the island. When President Jimmy Carter agreed to allow a selected group of Cubans to return in 1978, Casal assisted in drafting the list of participants. The meeting, which became known as "The Dialogue" brought members of the Cuban diaspora to Havana to discuss points of interest with Cuban officials. In addition to allowing separated families to reunite, "The Dialogue" resulted in the release of "thirty-six hundred political prisoners".

Beginning in 1977, Casal, who was diabetic, began to experience renal dysfunction and had to begin dialysis treatment. Though she continued trips to and from Cuba in her attempts to serve as a bridge between Cubans and Cuban-Americans, her health was in decline. In 1980, she participated in a conference as part of the activities of the Institute for Cuban Studies, which was held in Cuba, during the Mariel boatlift. Soon after the conference, she decided to return permanently to Cuba.

Legacy 
Casal died on 1 February 1981, aged 41 in Havana from complications of her illnesses. Her final work, Polabras juntan revolución (Words Join Revolution) received the Casa de las Américas Prize, posthumously shortly after her death. The impact she had on Cubans internationally left an important legacy for having begun the conversation between Cuban politicians and refugees through both her writing and advocacy. Her stance on reconciliation between the diaspora and Cuban politicians and support of the regime, impacted her status as an exile and for a period of time, she was omitted from Cuban-American literature compilations. A reawakening of her legacy coincided with talks of normalization of the US/Cuban relationship at the turn of the 21st century.

See also
 Cuban American literature
 List of Cuban-American writers

References 

1938 births
1981 deaths
20th-century Cuban poets
Cuban women poets
Cuban activists
Cuban expatriates in the United States
Caribbean people of African descent
American writers of Cuban descent
20th-century Cuban women writers